Siniša Ergotić (born 14 September 1968) is a Croatian long jumper.

He won the gold medal the 2001 Mediterranean Games in Tunis and the silver medal at the 2002 European Championships in Athletics in Munich. He has competed at three consecutive Summer Olympics, starting in 1996, without reaching the finals.

His personal best jump is 8.23 metres, achieved in June 2002 in Zagreb.

, Ergotić is the director of the Croatia national athletics team and is also the president of the Croatian Athletics Federation.

Competition record

References

External links

1968 births
Living people
Yugoslav male long jumpers
Croatian male long jumpers
Croatian sports executives and administrators
Athletes (track and field) at the 1996 Summer Olympics
Athletes (track and field) at the 2000 Summer Olympics
Athletes (track and field) at the 2004 Summer Olympics
Olympic athletes of Croatia
Sportspeople from Osijek
European Athletics Championships medalists
Mediterranean Games gold medalists for Croatia
Athletes (track and field) at the 2001 Mediterranean Games
Mediterranean Games medalists in athletics